Thomas "Lefty" Glover (1912 – June 7, 1948) was an American baseball player in the Negro leagues and the Mexican League. He played from 1934 to 1945 with several teams.

References

External links
 and Seamheads

1912 births
1948 deaths
Birmingham Black Barons players
Baltimore Elite Giants players
Tuberculosis deaths in Maryland
20th-century deaths from tuberculosis
20th-century African-American sportspeople
Baseball pitchers